In geometry, a secant is a line that intersects a curve at a minimum of two distinct points.
The word secant comes from the Latin word secare, meaning to cut. In the case of a circle, a secant intersects the circle at exactly two points. A chord is the line segment determined by the two points, that is, the interval on the secant whose ends are the two points.

Circles

A straight line can intersect a circle at zero, one, or two points. A line with intersections at two points is called a secant line, at one point a tangent line and at no points an exterior line. A chord is the line segment that joins two distinct points of a  circle. A chord is therefore contained in a unique secant line and each secant line determines a unique chord.

In rigorous modern treatments of plane geometry, results that seem obvious and were assumed (without statement) by Euclid in his treatment, are usually proved.

In some situations phrasing results in terms of secant lines instead of chords can help to unify statements. As an example of this consider the result:
If the point  lies inside the circle this is Euclid III.35, but if the point is outside the circle the result is not contained in the Elements. However, Robert Simson following Christopher Clavius demonstrated this result, sometimes called the intersecting secants theorem, in their commentaries on Euclid.

Curves
For curves more complicated than simple circles, the possibility that a line that intersects a curve in more than two distinct points arises. Some authors define a secant line to a curve as a line that intersects the curve in two distinct points. This definition leaves open the possibility that the line may have other points of intersection with the curve. When phrased this way the definitions of a secant line for circles and curves are identical and the possibility of additional points of intersection just does not occur for a circle.

Secants and tangents
Secants may be used to approximate the tangent line to a curve, at some point , if it exists. The secant lines  are the approximations to the tangent line. In calculus, this idea is the geometric definition of the derivative.

Sets and -secants
The concept of a secant line can be applied in a more general setting than Euclidean space. Let  be a finite set of  points in some geometric setting. For example, if  is a set of 50 points arranged on a circle in the Euclidean plane, a line joining two of them would be a 2-secant (or bisecant) and a line passing through only one of them would be a 1-secant (or unisecant). A unisecant in this example need not be a tangent line to the circle.

This terminology is often used in incidence geometry and discrete geometry. For instance, the Sylvester–Gallai theorem of incidence geometry states that if  points of Euclidean geometry are not collinear then there must exist a 2-secant of them. And the original orchard-planting problem of discrete geometry asks for a bound on the number of 3-secants of a finite set of points.

Finiteness of the set of points is not essential in this definition, as long as each line can intersect the set in only a finite number of points.

See also
Elliptic curve, a curve for which every secant has a third point of intersection, from which most of a group law may be defined
Mean value theorem, that every secant of the graph of a smooth function has a parallel tangent line
Quadrisecant, a line that intersects four points of a curve (usually a space curve)
Secant plane, the three-dimensional equivalent of a secant line
Secant variety, the union of secant lines and tangent lines to a given projective variety

References

External links
 

Curves